Pierre Nommesch (16 December 1864 – 9 October 1935) was the Bishop of Luxembourg from 1920 to 1935.

Biography
At the age of 26, on 28 October 1890 Nommesch was ordained a priest. On 8 March 1920 he was appointed Bishop of Luxembourg and on 25 March 1920 was consecrated by Sebastiano Nicotra. He remained in office until his death.

He became bishop after a long period of sede vacante, which was due to challenges to Luxembourg's national sovereignty after the Armistice of World War I.

His time in office was one of reconciliation and understanding between state and the church: The conflict around schools received a compromise solution in 1921, so that religious education, relegated to the church parishes since 1912, now once again had a place in public education. Under his episcopate, loyalty to the monarchy and to Luxembourgish traditions, closeness to Rome (with pilgrimages to the "holy city", and celebration of the papal coronation anniversaries) and veneration of the Virgin Mary (expansion of the cathedral, started in 1935) remained important facets of Luxembourgish Catholicism.

Further religious-pastoral high points of his time in office were the Eucharistic National Congress in 1924, increased devotion to the Sacred Heart, the rebuilding of the seminary at Limpertsberg in 1930, and a consolidation of associations in the Belgian-inspired Catholic Action after 1930.

See also

References 

20th-century Roman Catholic bishops in Luxembourg
1864 births
1935 deaths
Alumni of the Athénée de Luxembourg